Euagra is a genus of moths in the subfamily Arctiinae. The genus was erected by Francis Walker in 1854.

Species
Euagra angelica Butler, 1876 Colombia
Euagra azurea (Walker, 1854) Brazil
Euagra caerulea Dognin, 1891 Ecuador
Euagra cerymica Druce, 1893 Panama
Euagra chica Hampson, 1898 Bolivia
Euagra coelestina (Stoll, [1781]) French Guiana, Bolivia, Brazil (Pará)
Euagra delectans Schaus, 1911 Costa Rica
Euagra fenestra (Walker, 1854) Brazil
Euagra haemanthus (Walker, 1854) Mexico, Guatemala, Panama
Euagra intercisa Butler, 1876 Venezuela
Euagra klagesi Rothschild, 1912 Suriname
Euagra latera (Druce, 1890) Ecuador, Brazil (São Paulo)
Euagra monoscopa Kaye, 1919 Ecuador
Euagra perpasta Draudt, 1917 Colombia
Euagra seraphica Draudt, 1917 Colombia
Euagra splendida (Butler, 1876) Brazil (Santa Catarina)

References

Arctiinae